The following events occurred in August 1945:

August 1, 1945 (Wednesday)
Pierre Laval was brought to Paris to face trial.
Britain's new parliament assembled for the first time to elect a new Speaker of the House of Commons. As Winston Churchill entered the House for the first time as an ex-prime minister, he was greeted by cheers and singing of "For He's a Jolly Good Fellow", to which the Laborites responded by singing "The Red Flag". When Douglas Clifton Brown was re-elected Speaker he said he was not quite sure whether he was becoming chairman of the House of Commons or director of a musical show.
Mel Ott of the New York Giants became the third member of the 500 home run club with a shot off Johnny Hutchings of the Boston Braves.
Born: Douglas Osheroff, physicist and Nobel laureate, in Aberdeen, Washington

August 2, 1945 (Thursday)
In the heaviest raid of the war, 800 B-29s dropped more than 6,000 tons of incendiary bombs on Japanese cities and killed 80,000 people.
Paul Tibbets, pilot of the lead plane in the planned atomic bomb run, reported to General Curtis LeMay's Air Force headquarters on Guam and was briefed on the mission over Hiroshima.
The Potsdam Conference concluded.
Born: Joanna Cassidy, actress, in Haddonfield, New Jersey
Died: Pietro Mascagni, 81, Italian composer

August 3, 1945 (Friday)
The American government announced that every Japanese and Korean harbor of consequence had been mined, leaving Japan totally blockaded.
All Germans and Hungarians in Czechoslovakia were deprived of citizenship.

August 4, 1945 (Saturday)
The Soviets gifted a plaque to the U.S. Ambassador to Moscow that was secretly bugged with The Thing, one of the earliest covert listening devices ever invented. It would hang in the Spaso House for seven years until its secret was discovered.
Paul Tibbets briefed his crewmates on the bombing mission to Hiroshima, saying the bombs would be immensely powerful and "something new in the history of warfare", but giving no specifics.
Born: Paul McCarthy, performance artist and sculptor, in Salt Lake City, Utah; Alan Mulally, CEO of the Ford Motor Company from 2006 to 2014, in Oakland, California

August 5, 1945 (Sunday)
The U.S. Twentieth Air Force flew over twelve Japanese cities and dropped 720,000 pamphlets warning their populations to surrender or face devastation.
Paul Tibbets formally named the lead plane in the Hiroshima bombing mission the Enola Gay, after his mother. The B-29 that would take photos on the mission would be named Necessary Evil.
Born: Loni Anderson, actress, in Saint Paul, Minnesota.

August 6, 1945 (Monday)
Atomic bombing of Hiroshima: United States B-29 Superfortress Enola Gay dropped a uranium-235 atomic bomb codenamed "Little Boy" on the Japanese city of Hiroshima at 8:15 a.m. local time, resulting in between 90,000 and 146,000 deaths.
In a routine press release a little over 1,000 words in length, a statement from U.S. President Harry S. Truman informed the media that an atomic bomb with "more power than 20,000 tons of TNT" had been dropped on Hiroshima. The statement made no mention of radiation effects and the notion of an atomic bomb simply being a bigger version of a regular bomb persisted in the press for days afterward.
Died: Richard Bong, 24, United States Army major and highest-scoring air ace of WWII (killed in the crash of a test flight of an experimental aircraft); Hiram Johnson, 78, U.S. Senator from California

August 7, 1945 (Tuesday)
Radio Tokyo reported unspecifically about an attack on Hiroshima. The Americans were unable to immediately assess the results for themselves because of impenetrable cloud over the detonation site. Late in the day, Imperial Japanese headquarters referred to a "new type of bomb" used on Hiroshima, admitting that "only a small number of the new bombs were released, yet they did substantial damage."
Josip Broz Tito refused to permit Peter II to return to Yugoslavia.
The Nakajima Kikka made its first flight 
Born: Alan Page, jurist and Hall of Fame football player, in Canton, Ohio

August 8, 1945 (Wednesday)
Radio Tokyo gave its first full report on the Hiroshima bombing, concluding with the claim that the Americans had used methods which "have surpassed in hideous cruelty those of Genghis Khan."
The Soviet Union declared itself to be in a state of war with Japan as of midnight August 9.
The Nuremberg Charter was issued, setting down the laws and procedures by which the Nuremberg Trials were to be conducted.
The United States ratified the United Nations Charter.
The biographical war film Pride of the Marines starring John Garfield as U.S. Marine Al Schmid had a special world premiere in Schmid's home city of Philadelphia as part of "Al Schmid Day". More than 1,500 veterans of the Guadalcanal Campaign attended.

August 9, 1945 (Thursday)
Atomic bombing of Nagasaki: United States B-29 bomber Bockscar dropped a plutonium-239 atomic bomb codenamed "Fat Man" on the Japanese city of Nagasaki at 11:02 a.m. local time, resulting in between 39,000 and 80,000 deaths.
The Soviet–Japanese War began with the invasion of Manchukuo.
Mongolia declared war on Japan.
The Michigan train wreck killed 34 people at Michigan City, North Dakota.
Born:  Tom O'Carroll, paedophilia advocate, in Warwickshire, England; Posy Simmonds, newspaper cartoonist and children's illustrator, in Berkshire, England
Died: Harry Hillman, 63, American athlete and winner of three gold medals at the 1904 Summer Olympics

August 10, 1945 (Friday)
The Japanese government announced that a message had been sent to the Allies accepting the terms of the Potsdam Declaration provided that it "does not comprise any demand that prejudices the prerogatives of the Emperor as sovereign ruler."
The Chinese Civil War resumed with the beginning of the Opening Campaign.
Died: Robert H. Goddard, 62, American engineer, physicist and inventor of the world's first liquid-fueled rocket

August 11, 1945 (Saturday)
The Soviet Invasion of South Sakhalin began when Soviet forces invaded the Japanese territorial portion of the island of Sakhalin.
U.S. Secretary of State James F. Byrnes replied to Japan's offer with a refusal to compromise on the demand that the surrender be unconditional.
The violent events referred to as the Kraków pogrom occurred in the Soviet-occupied city of Kraków, Poland.
"On the Atchison, Topeka and the Santa Fe" by Johnny Mercer hit #1 on the Billboard singles charts.
Died: Róża Berger, 56, only victim of the Kraków pogrom (shot by security forces)

August 12, 1945 (Sunday)
Soviet forces advanced onto the Korean Peninsula.
The US government releases the Smyth Report, outlining the development of the atomic bomb.
Born: Ron Mael, American musician (Sparks), in Culver City, California

August 13, 1945 (Monday)
The Southern Jiangsu Campaign began as part of the Chinese Civil War.
The World Zionist Congress demanded that 1 million Jews be admitted to Palestine.

August 14, 1945 (Tuesday)
Emperor Hirohito recorded a radio message to the Japanese people saying that the war should end and that they must "bear the unbearable." That night the Kyūjō incident occurred, an effort by a group of officers to steal the recording and stop the move to surrender. The attempt would fail and the conspirators would commit suicide.
The August Revolution began when the Viet Minh launched an uprising against French colonial rule in Vietnam.
Alfred Eisenstaedt took the V-J Day in Times Square photograph of an American sailor kissing a woman in a white dress during V-J Day celebrations in New York City.
Born: Steve Martin, comedian, actor, writer, producer and musician, in Waco, Texas; Wim Wenders, filmmaker, playwright, author and photographer, in Düsseldorf, Germany

August 15, 1945 (Wednesday)
Bombing of Kumagaya, Japan, by the United States using conventional bombs, beginning at 00:23.
Hirohito surrender broadcast (Gyokuon-hōsō): Emperor Hirohito's announcement of the unconditional surrender of Japan was broadcast on the radio a little after noon (12:00 Japan Standard Time is 03:00 GMT). This was probably the first time an Emperor of Japan had been heard by the common people. Delivered in formal classical Japanese, without directly referring to surrender and following official censorship of the country's weak position, the recorded speech was not immediately easily understood by ordinary people. The Allies called this day Victory over Japan Day (V-J Day). This ended the period of Japanese expansionism, and began the period of the Occupation of Japan. The Allies abandoned Operation Downfall. Korea gained independence.
The Philippines Campaign ended in decisive Allied victory.
The Battle of Baoying began in central Jiangsu, China as part of the Chinese Civil War.
The British government revealed details of one of the biggest secrets of the war, radar.
89-year old Philippe Pétain was sentenced to death in Paris court for treason, but Charles de Gaulle gave him a reprieve on account of his age.
Died: Korechika Anami, 58, Japanese general and War Minister (seppuku); Matome Ugaki, 55, Japanese admiral (killed attempting a final kamikaze mission)

August 16, 1945 (Thursday)
Emperor Hirohito issued a decree at 4:00 p.m. local time ordering all Japanese forces to cease fire. The Japanese cabinet resigned.
Winston Churchill made a speech in the House of Commons referring to an "iron curtain" descending across Europe.
The Battle of Yongjiazhen began as part of the Chinese Civil War.
Died: Takijirō Ōnishi, 54, Japanese admiral (seppuku)

August 17, 1945 (Friday)
 Indonesia declared her independence. The Indonesian National Revolution began afterwards.
 Prince Naruhiko Higashikuni became Prime Minister of Japan. He ordered the Imperial Army to obey the Emperor's call to lay down their arms.
 The Battle of Tianmen was fought as part of the Chinese Civil War, resulting in communist victory.
 George Orwell's allegorical and dystopian novella Animal Farm was published in England.

August 18, 1945 (Saturday)
Sukarno became 1st President of Indonesia.
The Soviet Invasion of the Kuril Islands began, opening with the Battle of Shumshu.
U.S. Army photographer Anthony J. Marchione became the last American to die in WWII when the B-32 he was flying in over Tokyo was damaged by enemy fire.
Died: Netaji Subhas Chandra Bose, 48, Indian nationalist, in what is generally believed to be a plane crash in Formosa although alternative theories persist
Sukarno and Stolen Buick At 18 August 1945 Sudiro and several Youth took the initiative to present a state car for his president. The unique Buick car is a stolen car. Sudiro apparently stole it from a Japanese official Head of Railway Administration. Until finally the driver handed over the key and was given a fare to return to Kebumen so that his employer would not look for him. Sukarno and Stolen Cars

August 19, 1945 (Sunday)
The Soviet assault on Maoka began.
The Battle of Yongjiazhen ended in communist victory.
Born: Ian Gillan, rock singer and songwriter (Deep Purple), in Chiswick, London, England
Died: Tomás Burgos, 69, Chilean philanthropist

August 20, 1945 (Monday)
Vidkun Quisling went on trial in Oslo.
British Foreign Secretary Ernest Bevin condemned Soviet policy in Eastern Europe as "one kind of totalitarianism replaced by another."

August 21, 1945 (Tuesday)
President Truman ordered that Lend-Lease aid be halted immediately.
The first major Japanese surrender ceremony in China took place at the Zhijiang Airport in Hunan Province.

August 22, 1945 (Wednesday)
The Soviet assault on Maoka was completed.
Soviet forces took Munchukuo's puppet ruler Puyi into custody.
Born: Ron Dante, singer, songwriter and record producer, on Staten Island, New York

August 23, 1945 (Thursday)
The Battle of Shumshu ended in Soviet victory.
The Battle of Baoying ended in communist victory.
Soviet–Japanese War – Joseph Stalin ordered conveying a Japanese army prisoner of war to the Soviet Union. (Japanese prisoners of war in the Soviet Union)

August 24, 1945 (Friday)
The Battle of Wuhe was fought as part of the Chinese Civil War, resulting in communist victory.
Matsue incident: Approximately 40 Japanese dissidents opposed to surrender attacked facilities in Matsue.
British Prime Minister Clement Attlee told Parliament that Britain was in "a very serious financial position" due to the abrupt ending of Lend-Lease and that "the initial deficit with which we start the task of re-establishing our own economy and of contracting our overseas commitments is immense."
Born: Vince McMahon, professional wrestling promoter, announcer and CEO of WWE, in Pinehurst, North Carolina

August 25, 1945 (Saturday) 
 The Invasion of South Sakhalin ended in Soviet victory.
 Spruille Braden was appointed Assistant Secretary of State for American Republic Affairs after Nelson Rockefeller resigned.
 The Bảo Đại Emperor abdicated as a result of the August Revolution ending the Empire of Vietnam.  
 Died: Willis Augustus Lee, 57, American admiral (heart attack)

August 26, 1945 (Sunday)
The Huaiyin–Huai'an Campaign and the Battle of Yinji began as part of the Chinese Civil War.
Born: Tom Ridge, politician and 1st United States Secretary of Homeland Security, in Munhall, Pennsylvania
Died: Franz Werfel, 54, Austrian-Bohemian novelist, playwright and poet

August 27, 1945 (Monday)
The Battle of Yinji ended in communist victory.
The Texas hurricane made landfall near Seadrift, Texas. The storm resulted in three fatalities and $20 million in damage.
Born: Marianne Sägebrecht, film actress, in Starnberg, Germany

August 28, 1945 (Tuesday)
The Allied occupation of Japan began.
The Southern Jiangsu Campaign ended in communist victory.

August 29, 1945 (Wednesday)
The Xinghua Campaign began in China.
The Rodgers and Hammerstein musical film State Fair starring Jeanne Crain, Dana Andrews and Dick Haymes was released.
Died: Fritz Pfleumer, 64, German-Austrian engineer

August 30, 1945 (Thursday)
A British battle squadron led by the aircraft carrier Indomitable arrived at Hong Kong to reoccupy the colony.
The Allied Control Council constituted itself in Germany.
Douglas MacArthur landed in Japan and set up temporary headquarters in Yokohama.

August 31, 1945 (Friday)
Douglas MacArthur established the Supreme Allied Command in Tokyo.
France ratified the United Nations Charter.
The Liberal Party of Australia was founded to replace the United Australia Party.
Born: Van Morrison, singer and songwriter, in Belfast, Northern Ireland; Itzhak Perlman, violinist and conductor, in Tel Aviv, Mandatory Palestine; Bob Welch, musician (Fleetwood Mac), in Los Angeles, California (d. 2012)
Died: Stefan Banach, 53, Polish mathematician (lung cancer)

References

1945
1945-08
1945-08